Kenneth Henry Jarvis Miles (1 November 1918 – 17 August 1966) was a British sports car racing engineer and driver best known for his motorsport career in the US and with American teams on the international scene. He is an inductee to the Motorsports Hall of Fame of America.

Early life 
Miles was born on 1 November 1918 in Sutton Coldfield, then in Warwickshire, now in the city of Birmingham. He was the son of Eric Miles and Clarice Jarvis. After a failed attempt to run away to the United States, Miles left school at the age of 15 to work as an apprentice at Wolseley Motors, who sent him to a technical school to broaden his knowledge of vehicle construction. He raced motorcycles before joining the British Army, during World War II.

Miles' first role in the military was driving instructor in Territorial Army. On 1 October 1942, as an armament artificer, he was among the founding members of the Royal Electrical and Mechanical Engineers (REME), and transferred to the REME Training Establishment. The following year Miles was posted to Guards Armoured Division Workshops, followed by the 29th Armoured Brigade Workshop. He landed in Normandy on 15 June 1944, and later that year was posted to the  Light Aid Detachment of the 15th/19th King’s Royal Hussars. Miles served in North West Europe until the end of the war, by which time he had achieved the rank of staff sergeant. He served as a tank commander, and the experience is said to have fuelled a new love in Miles for high-performance engineering. He was discharged to the reserves on 1 April 1946.

Racing career 
After the war, Miles raced Bugattis, Alfa Romeos, and Alvises with the Vintage Sports Car Club. He then turned to a Ford V8 Frazer-Nash.

In 1952 Miles moved from England to the US, and settled in Los Angeles, California as a service manager for Gough Industries, the Southern California MG distributor. In 1953, he won 14 straight victories in SCCA racing in an MG-based special of his own design and construction.

For the 1955 season, he designed, constructed and campaigned a second special based on MG components that was known as the "Flying Shingle". It was very successful in the SCCA F modified class on the west coast. Miles raced the "Flying Shingle" at Palm Springs in late March, finishing first overall against veteran driver Cy Yedor, also in an MG Special, and novice driver, actor James Dean in a Porsche 356 Speedster. Miles was later disqualified on a technical infraction because his fenders were too wide, thus allowing Yedor and Dean to get 'bumped up' to first and second. During 1956, Miles raced John von Neumann's Porsche 550 Spyder at most of the Cal Club and SCCA events.

For the 1957 season (in co-operation with Otto Zipper), Miles engineered the installation of a Porsche 550S engine and transmission in a 1956 Cooper chassis and body. It was the second successful race car to be known on the West Coast as "the Pooper", the first being an early 1950s Cooper chassis and body powered by a Porsche 356 power train that was built and campaigned by Pete Lovely of Tacoma, Washington. The resulting car dominated the F Modified class of SCCA on the west coast in the 1957 and 1958 seasons with Miles driving.

Due to his great skill and talent, both as a driver and mechanical engineer, Miles was a significant member of the Shelby/Cobra race team in the early 1960s. Miles described himself this way:
I am a mechanic. That has been the direction of my entire vocational life. Driving is a hobby, a relaxation for me, like golfing is to others.  I should like to drive a Formula One machine, not for the grand prize, but just to see what it is like.  I should think it would be jolly good fun!

With a very pronounced Brummie accent (from his hometown of Birmingham, renowned for car manufacturing) combined with a seemingly obscure and sardonic sense of humour, he was affectionately known by his American racing crew as "Teddy Teabag" (for his tea drinking) or "Sidebite" (as he talked out of the side of his mouth). He played a major role in the development and success of the racing versions of the Shelby Cobra 289 in SCCA, USRRC and FIA sports car racing between 1962 and 1965 as well as the Daytona Coupe and 427 versions of the Cobra and the Ford GT (GT40).

He became the chief test driver of Shelby-American in 1963.

Miles had a "reputation for courtesy on the track" and was sometimes called the "Stirling Moss of the West Coast". While a member of the AC-Cobra Ford Team, Miles entered a Lotus 23 in the 1964 Player's 200 at Mosport. 

In 1965, he shared a Ford GT Mk II with Bruce McLaren at the 24 Hours of Le Mans but retired with gearbox trouble. Earlier in the year, also with McLaren, he had finished second at the 12 Hours of Sebring.

The next year he won the 24 Hours of Daytona, sharing the Ford GT Mk II with Lloyd Ruby, and then won the 12 Hours of Sebring. Several months later, sharing the drive with Denny Hulme, Miles was leading the 1966 24 Hours of Le Mans in the #1 car, but Ford Motor Company executive Leo Beebe, desiring a publicity photo of three of Ford's cars crossing the finish line together, instructed Miles to slow down, which he did. Accordingly, on the final lap the next car from Ford driven by Bruce McLaren/Chris Amon and the third-place car from Ford drew up, and they cruised to the line together. The French race officials, after initially agreeing to Ford's dead-heat "photo-finish", reneged during the final hour of the race. Although Miles's #1 car and McLaren's #2 car crossed the finish line together, McLaren's #2 was declared the winner because having started in second position behind Miles's car, it had therefore covered 8 meters more distance during the race. Miles was denied the unique achievement of winning Sebring, Daytona, and Le Mans in the same year.

Death
The Ford J-car was intended to be the successor to the Ford GT40 Mk II and, despite reliability problems, showed potential in the springtime Le Mans trials. After the death of Walt Hansgen in a J-car while testing at Le Mans in April, Ford decided to shelve the J-car and focus on the proven Mk IIs. Little development was done for the rest of the 1966 World Sports Car Championship season. In August 1966, Shelby American resumed testing and development work with Miles as primary test driver. The J-car featured a breadvan-shaped rear section experimenting with Kammback aerodynamic theories, and a honeycomb panel design supposed to both lighten and stiffen the car, but the design was unproven with high-speed prototype sports cars.

After almost a day of testing at Riverside International Raceway in the very hot Southern California desert, Miles approached the end of the track's  downhill back straight at top speed—over 200 miles per hour (320 km/h)—when the car suddenly looped, flipped, crashed, and caught fire. The car broke into pieces and ejected Miles, killing him instantly. 

After the crash, the aerodynamics of the J-car were greatly modified to correct the rear-end lift generated at race speeds. Years later Porsche and others had the same problem, as the long low silhouette of a Kammback tailed car behaves like an aerofoil aircraft wing and lifts at high speed. Ford executives, under pressure after the second fatal accident in the program in five months, ordered a roll cage be installed in future versions of the car. The significantly revised J-car, renamed the Ford Mk IV, won the only two races in which it was entered: the 1967 Sebring 12 Hours, and the 1967 24 Hours of Le Mans.

Miles is interred at the Abbey of the Psalms Mausoleum of the Hollywood Forever Cemetery in Hollywood, California.

Awards and honours
Miles was posthumously inducted into the Motorsports Hall of Fame of America in 2001.

Racing record

USAC Road Racing Championship results

Formula One World Championship results
(key)

24 Hours of Le Mans results

24 Hours of Daytona results

12 Hours of Sebring results

Personal life 
Ken Miles was married to Mollie and had a son, Peter Miles (born September 28, 1950). He was also a close friend of Carroll Shelby. Peter was almost 16 when he witnessed his father's death in the prototype J-car crash in 1966. A few months after Ken's death, Peter went to work for Ken's friend Dick Troutman at the Troutman and Barnes custom car shop in Culver City, California. Peter stayed at the workshop for four years. In 1986, Peter joined Precision Performance Inc. (PPI), starting as a fabricator and then a mechanic before becoming the crew chief. Peter was the crew chief for Ivan Stewart when Stewart won the 1991 Nissan 400 in Nevada. In a 2019 interview with Le Mans, Peter said that the last time he went to Le Mans was in 1965 with his father Ken, and he has not returned since.

In popular culture
Miles is portrayed by Christian Bale in the 2019 film Ford v Ferrari (released under the title Le Mans '66 in some parts of Europe). Miles's wife Mollie and his son Peter are portrayed by Caitriona Balfe and Noah Jupe, respectively.

References

External links

 Shelby American Automobile Club World Registry of Cobras & GT40s
 .

1918 births
1966 deaths
English expatriates in the United States
English racing drivers
Racing drivers who died while racing
Sports deaths in California
24 Hours of Le Mans drivers
24 Hours of Daytona drivers
World Sportscar Championship drivers
12 Hours of Sebring drivers
British Army personnel of World War II
Burials at Hollywood Forever Cemetery